Walter Harry "Chip" Lubsen, Jr. (born July 13, 1955 in Alexandria, Virginia) is an American former competitive rower and Olympic silver medalist. He was a member of Cornell University's varsity heavyweight eight boat that won the IRA championship in 1977.

Olympian
Lubsen participated in the men's eights at the 1976 Summer Olympics and placed 9th overall. He qualified for the 1980 U.S. Olympic team but was unable to compete due to the 1980 Summer Olympics boycott. Lubsen did however receive one of 461 Congressional Gold Medals created especially for the spurned athletes. He was a member of the American men's eights team that won the silver medal at the 1984 Summer Olympics in Los Angeles, California.

References

1955 births
Living people
Rowers at the 1976 Summer Olympics
Rowers at the 1984 Summer Olympics
Olympic silver medalists for the United States in rowing
American male rowers
Medalists at the 1984 Summer Olympics
Congressional Gold Medal recipients
Pan American Games medalists in rowing
Pan American Games gold medalists for the United States
Rowers at the 1979 Pan American Games